Polonaise is a Polmos Łańcut vodka made from quality rectified grain spirit and water. According to its producer it has a pleasant and delicate aroma and flavor with notes of the grain it is made from. It contains 40% alcohol by volume.

The vodka is named after the national Polish dance Polonaise.

See also 
 Distilled beverage
 List of vodkas

External links 
Polmos Łańcut
An article about the Polonaise vodka 

Polish brands
Polish vodkas